(Charles) Leycester Devenish Meares  (16 January 1909 – 5 August 1994) was an Australian judge and patron of the arts. He was also chairman and benefactor of the national child safety organisation Kidsafe.The Leycester Meares Award for innovative design in children’s play equipment is awarded annually in his honour at the Australian Kidsafe Awards.

Early life
Leycester Meares was born in Sydney and attended Newington College (1924–1926). In 1927 he went up to the University of Sydney and graduated in law in 1932.

Legal career
Meares was admitted to the NSW Bar in 1932 and was appointed Queen's Counsel in 1954. He appeared in the trial of both The Wagon Mound (No 1), and the Wagon Mound (No 2). In 1967 he was named as an acting judge of the Supreme Court of New South Wales. The position was made permanent in 1969. Other legal positions held included president of the Martial Appeals Tribunal, president of the New South Wales Medico-Legal Society, president of the Australian Bar Association and chairman of the NSW Law Reform Commission.

War service
Meares served with the Australian Army in World War II, attained the rank of temporary lieutenant colonel and was mentioned in despatches.

Community involvement
He served as chairman of the National Advisory Council for the Handicapped, and was foundation chairman of Kidsafe from 1979.

Honours
 Companion of the Order of St Michael and St George - 1978, for service to the community, especially to the handicapped.
 Companion of the Order of Australia - 1985, for distinguished public service to the Australian honours system and for continued distinguished service in the field of social welfare.

References

1909 births
1994 deaths
Judges of the Supreme Court of New South Wales
Companions of the Order of Australia
Australian Companions of the Order of St Michael and St George
People educated at Newington College
University of Sydney alumni
Australian King's Counsel